Ivanova Tamarin and Olga Tamarin were two Russian serial killers, cannibals, and bandits who murdered at least 40 people in the Kurdino village of Novaya Ladoga, Russia in the year 1909. A mother and daughter, the two were leaders of a gang made up of 41 people. After remains were found in Ivanova and Olga Tamarin's home as well as the surrounding forest, 32 members of the gang were arrested, while nine others evaded capture.

Murders 
Over the span of a few months in 1909, Ivanova and Olga sent accomplices out to nearby villages to lure victims to their house. The accomplices would approach men and state that 17-year-old Olga Tamarin, known for her beauty, wished to get married. After a victim arrived at the house, they would be dropped into a cellar by a trapdoor in the dining room. In the cellar, victims were tied up and tortured to death with several devices. Ivanova and Olga then ate part of their victims' remains and stole valuable items from them, such as their watches. They also murdered multiple women.

One of their victims was Abdul Haligulin, a young, wealthy merchant who was staying in Kurdino. His disfigured body was discovered along the bank of a creek in the spring of 1909. His cheeks and chin had been cut off.

Arrest and conviction 
After the discovery of at least 13 mutilated corpses in a nearby forest, suspicion soon fell on Ivanova and Olga Tamarin. Other villagers had frequently seen men enter the residence, but never saw them come out. A local policeman disguised himself as a beggar and was invited into the Tamarins' home. He immediately smelled the odor of corpses and ran to escape. Ivanova threw an axe at him but missed. On 6 May 1909, gendarmes led by Colonel Vassiteff surrounded Ivanova and Olga's house. Ivanova and Olga shot at them with revolvers, but the two were eventually disarmed and arrested. Then, the premises were searched and 27 more corpses were discovered hidden under a stack of hay in the barn.

After they were arrested, they revealed that they had 39 accomplices in their village. 30 of these accomplices were arrested and convicted, but nine others were never caught.

In media 
The music video of "Frozen Beauties" by the metal band AkiaveL depicts the story of Ivanova and Olga Tamarin.

See also 

 Crime in Russia
 List of Russian serial killers
 List of serial killers by number of victims

Notes

References 

Russian crime bosses
Russian female serial killers
Russian cannibals
Criminal duos
Russian people convicted of murder
Female cannibals
Crime families
1909 murders in the Russian Empire
20th-century murders in Russia
20th-century Russian criminals
Torturers

1892 births
Year of death missing